The Aram Khachaturian Museum was established in 1978 in Yerevan, Armenia, just after the composer's death. The first permanent exposition was opened on January 23rd 1984 on the occasion of the 80th anniversary of the outstanding composer. 

The idea of the museum came about in the 1970s, and Khachaturian himself was involved in its design. The composer left his manuscripts, letters, piano, various memorabilia, and personal gifts to the institution in his will. The building is an extension of the house where the composer resided whenever he visited the Armenian capital. It was converted into a museum by architect Edvard Altunyan.

Under its founding director Gohar Harutiunyan, the museum succeeded in attracting financial support from a wide range of sponsors and benefactors, and expanded its collection of artifacts belonging to Khachaturian. Today the museum continues to grow under the directorship of Armine Grigoryan.

The multi-storied building houses an attractive concert hall (with a concert-grand Bechstein piano), where a regular music series takes place. It also houses an extensive library of CDs and a workshop for the restoration and repair of violins. The museum maintains strong links to Armenian musicians and composers and is committed to furthering music in Armenia. It also publishes a range of scholarly books.

The Museum is located on 3 Zarobyan St (off Marshal Bagramyan Ave), Yerevan 0009, Armenia. Tel: (374-10) 58.94.18.

References

Museum publications

Արամ Խաչատրյան. Նամակներ (Yerevan: «Սովետական գրող» հրատարակչություն, 1983), 238 pp.
Արամ Խաչատրյան. Նամակներ (Yerevan։ «Ապոլոն» հրատարակչություն, 1995), 252 pp.
Արամ Խաչատրյան. Նամակներ (Yerevan։ «Նաիրի» հրատարակչություն,  2003), 152 pp. 
Aram Khachaturyan Museum (Yerevan: Armenia Press,  2002).
Aram Khachaturian (Album)(Yerevan: Aram Khachaturian Museum, "Krunk", 2012).
Aram Khachaturian and The Contemporary World(Yerevan: "Tigran Mets" Publishing House, 2014).
Aram Khachaturian. Arrangements for Piano Trio(Yerevan: "Komitas", 2016).
Արամ Խաչատրյան. Նամականի (Yerevan: «Հայաստան» հրատարակչություն,2017)
Арам Хачатурян." Письма" (Yerevan: «Հայաստան» հրատարակչություն,на русском языке,2018)
'Aram Khachaturian and The Contemporary World(Yerevan: Aram Khachaturian Museum, "Hayastan" Publishing House, 2019).Aram Khachaturian. Suite From Incidental Music to M. Lermontov's Drama "Masquerade" For Piano (Yerevan: "Hayastan" Publishing House, 2020).Aram Khachaturian. Excerpts From The Ballets "Gayane" and "Spartacus" For Two Pianos'' (Yerevan: "Amrots Group", 2020).

See also 
 List of music museums

External links 
 About Aram Khachaturian's house museum
 Museum official site

Museums in Yerevan
Biographical museums in Armenia
Music museums
Music organizations based in Armenia